Giuseppe Ornati - (1887 in Albairate near Milan – 1965 in Milan).

Considered to be one of the greatest violin makers of his time, he trained as a carpenter and then received the first notions of violin making from the amateur maker Carlo Moneta.

Towards 1903, he went to work at the workshop of Leandro Bisiach, where he stayed for some years working alongside Gaetano Sgarabotto.

Distinguished from the outset by the skill and precision of his work, he made many instruments and carried out repairs for Bisiach until 1919, by which time he already had his own workshop.

His production is characterized by accuracy and elegance.

References

Worked at Milan 1915. Gold medals at Rome (1923), and Milan (1924).

External links
La Liuteria Italiana / Italian Violin Making in the 1800s and 1900s - Umberto Azzolina
 
La Liuteria Lombarda del '900 - Roberto Codazzi, Cinzia Manfredini  2002
Dictionary of 20th Century Italian Violin Makers - Marlin Brinser 1978 
 
 
 Liuteria Parmense

View a fine example of  Giuseppe Ornati  violin Milan  circa 1921 close-up:
     Giuseppe Ornati Milan  1921 top.
     Giuseppe Ornati Milan  1921 back.
     Giuseppe Ornati Milan  1921 scroll.

1887 births
1965 deaths
People from the Province of Milan
Italian luthiers